Finders, Keepers is a novel by Sapan Saxena. The story takes place across the Indian subcontinent starting from the holy town of Allahabad. It visits several holy sites in India. The story takes place at various places of spiritual importance in India. The novel deals with mythological themes, highlighting a conflict between a newly active historical sect worshipping Shiva and a powerful secret organization, the Nine Unknown Men.

Plot summary
A murder takes place in the town of Haridwar. The victim is a history professor who has little or no affinity with the place. The killer is unknown but has left some religious symbols on the naked body of the professor which is found a few kilometers away from the place of murder. A week later, another murder takes place in similar circumstances in the holy town of Srikakulam. 
Troubled by the murder of two of his most trusted allies and by two subsequent heists in Kolkata and Bikaner, the working head of National Society for Hindu Consciousness, Mrityunjai Pradhan turns to the Intelligence Bureau of India for help with the case.

Themes
The book deals with two major themes. First of all, it deals with the historical achievements of India. This is done by referring to the Nine Unknown Men from Talbot Mundy's 1923 novel. The novel explores the history and usage of some ancient Indian technology and art appearing in their books. The second theme is the signs and symbols related to Shiva, a Hindu deity.

Characters and locations
The main characters of the novel are:

Shoumik Haldar – Deputy Director of the Information Bureau of India.

Ishan Vajpayee – An author.

Mrityunjai Pradhan – A philosopher and head of a secret organization, Nine Unknown Men.

Markandey Trivedi – A very simple and honest man who has taken a wrong turn towards murder in his blind devotion towards Shiva.

Surbhi Sinha – Young MLA with great alchemical ability.

Reception
The New Indian Express covered the launch in Bhubaneshwar which was attended by Padma Shri Prafulla Kar and eminent novelist Santanu Kumar Acharya and noted ghazal singer Subhashish Panigrahi.
 The Allahabad launch, which took place at Motilal Nehru National Institute of Technology during their cultural festival, Culrav was attended by the grandson of Madan Mohan Malviya, Shri Girdhar Malviya.

 The Delhi launch of the book was attended by Bharatiya Janta Party MP from Meerut, Shri Rajendra Agarwal. The Hindu covered the book in its Friday Fever section.

Dinesh Misra from Amar Ujala said, "The book forces people to question their existence and their history which was taken for granted all along the time. The writer however has skipped certain explanations in the book." Misra was critical of the size of the book and its simple writing style. Suraj Chand Rajwar from Book Review India said, "It's a thick book full of mythological puzzles that dazzles you with mythological doses and at the edge thriller". Samata Dey from IndiaCafe said "Sapan offered a very interesting story, where not only the plot but the atmosphere and the scenario the plot is based in, becomes the primal focus too. Some simple yet very confusing questions are asked in the different parts of the book which are related to the famous historical figures which is mind boggling."

Archita from Book Adorers wrote "Lovers of mysteries and the ones with a knack of questioning can get to experience a journey filled with euphoria by reading this book. Length and title-less chapters are no excuse to not reading the book. A must read!"

References

External links
Leadstart Publishing — Official website

2015 Indian novels
2015 debut novels